Mark Crick (born 27 January 1975 in Australia) was an Australian-born United States rugby union player. His playing position was hooker. He was selected as a reserve for the United States at the 2007 Rugby World Cup, but did not make an appearance.

Reference list

External links
itsrugby.co.uk profile

1975 births
Living people
Australian rugby union players
Rugby union hookers
Rugby union players from Dubbo
United States international rugby union players
Ulster Rugby players